Aryan Valley, historically known as Dah Hanu valley or region, is an area comprising four villages — Dah and Hanu in Leh district, and Garkon and Darchik in Kargil district — and associated hamlets in Central Ladakh, India. Until its absorption into the Maryul kingdom, Brokpa chiefs wielded nominal autonomy in the region. 

The current name originated in the tourism industry c. 2010 to market the Brokpas, the local inhabitants, as being the primordial Aryans. However, the existence of any such linkage has been refuted by anthropologists and geneticists.

Geography and economy 
Historically, the area was known as Dah Hanu valley or region to the British administrators, and as Brog Yul, "Hill country," in Tibetan. The villages and hamlets are situated 70 km from Kargil; they lie south of the Hindukush-Karakoram mountain range at an elevation of 9000–10000 feet.

Agriculture — especially the cultivation of fruits like apricots and grapes — is the main driver of the economy.

History

Brokpas
The region is inhabited by the Brokpas — an exonym, used by the Ladakhis (lit. Highlanders) —, who are a sub-group of the Shin people. From their oral history, it can be reasoned that Dah-Hanu region was first occupied c. 10th century by a group of migratory Shinas who practiced the largely-animist ancient Dardic religion, and staked claim to the Minaro ethnic identity. About six hundred years hence, another group of Shinas — influenced by Hinduism and Buddhism — migrated to Dah-Hanu, fomenting a conflict but yet chose to live together. Until its absorption into the Maryul kingdom, their chiefs wielded nominal autonomy in the region. 

Uninfluenced by Islam to any significant extent, the Brokpas of Dah-Hanu maintained a unique culture unlike most of neighboring Shinas.

Aryan association and neologism
In 1880, G. W. Leitner, a British orientalist, called the Brokpas "remnants of an ancient and pure Aryan race" — this trope would be reinforced by other colonial administrators, effectively exoticising them. The claims hold no merit and they run contrary to genetic analyses of the Brokpas. Mona Bhan, a Professor of South Asian Studies and Anthropology at Syracuse University, notes that such ahistorical racialising of linguistic and cultural traits has persisted even in modern ethnography on the Brokpas.

In 1980, H. P. S. Ahluwalia reported having met three German Neo-nazi female tourists who attended a Brokpa festival and hoped to be impregnated by the "pure Aryans"; such mythical tourists would be a staple of media coverage on the region. Over time, the Brokpas imbibed the Aryan characterization to the extent of tracing descent from Alexander's army. During the 2003 elections to the Kargil Hill Council, they claimed representation to the minority seats based on their Aryan identity, among other factors. However, this self-fashioning differed from the usual connotations of "Aryan" in the West. For the Brokpas, their Aryan identity laid in a millennia-old-struggle to maintain a unique identity in the face of persecution by various rulers, as told through folk-lores, and was a tool to improve their abject socioeconomic marginalization.

Beginning in 2010, as the Government wished to attract tourism to the region, local travel agents began to market the "Aryan-ness" of the inhabitants; the state government reinforced the trend by projecting the Brokpa people as "pure specimens of the Aryan race". Some Brogpas even changed their surnames to "Aryan". The name "Aryan Valley" was created within this discourse. In 2019, locals demanded that the "Aryan valley" be declared as a heritage village to boost tourism. The discourse on the Aryan traits of the Brokpas has been increasingly appropriated by right-wing Hindutva groups to leverage their supposed indigeneity against the Muslim other and to "validate their hold on India's disputed territory".

See also
Ladakh Lok Sabha constituency

Notes

References

Bibliography
Printed sources

 

 
 
 

 

 

 

 
 
 

 

Web-sources

External links
 
 
 
 
 
 

Ladakh
Regions of India